
Elkton may refer to:

Communities

Canada
Elkton, Alberta

United States
Elkton, Colorado
Elkton, Florida
Elkton, Kentucky
Elkton, Maryland
Elkton, Michigan
Elkton, Minnesota
Elkton, Missouri
Elkton, Ohio
Elkton, Oregon
Elkton, South Dakota
Elkton, Tennessee
Elkton, Virginia

See also
Elkton Township, Clay County, Minnesota
West Elkton, Ohio